Zarvav, also known as Zarvar, may refer to:
 Zarvav-e Olya
 Zarvav-e Sofla